Arnaia Province was one of the provinces of the Chalkidiki Prefecture, Greece. Its territory corresponded with that of the current municipality Aristotelis. It was abolished in 2006.

References

Provinces of Greece